Aleksei Vasiliev (Алексей Васильев ; born September 10, 1984) is a retired Russian professional ice hockey forward who played in the Russian Superleague with both HC MVD and Molot-Prikamye Perm.

External links

1984 births
HC MVD players
Living people
Molot-Prikamye Perm players
Russian ice hockey forwards